The Ventura County Fire Department (VCFD) provides fire protection and emergency response services for the unincorporated areas of Ventura County, California, and for seven other cities within the county.  Together, these areas compose the Ventura County Fire Protection District in the state of California, USA.  The Ventura County Board of Supervisors is the fire district's board of directors.  These five elected supervisors appoint the fire chief, and task him with providing fire protection services for the district.

In addition to the unincorporated areas of Ventura County, the department currently provides the following cities with service: Camarillo, Moorpark, Ojai, Port Hueneme, Santa Paula, Simi Valley, and Thousand Oaks.

History
On May 11, 1928 the Ventura County Fire Protection District (VCFPD) was established. It wasn't for another two years that a 24-hour Fire Warden was placed on duty.

As the population of the county grew, the VCFD grew as well. In 1946 the department added radios to all of their trucks and rose to a total of 34 personnel. Nearly 33 years later in 1969, the department added a second radio frequency and added a full-time dispatch center at Station 31 in Thousand Oaks. Four years later in 1973, VCFD changed their engines from traditional Fire Engine Red to Yellow.

Apparatus

Engine and medic engine
Ventura County uses two main types of engines. The first is the standard engine, which is often referred to as a "triple-combination pumper" as it has a fire pump, water tank and fire hose. Each engine can deliver 1,500 GPM of water and carry 500 gallons of water. The engines also carry multiple ground ladders and different types of hose as well as various types of firefighting, rescue and medical equipment. The second type of engine is the Medic Engine. The only real difference between the medic engine and the standard engine is that the medic engines are capable of advanced life support (ALS) with a firefighter also being a fully trained Advanced Life Support (ALS) paramedic. These units have additional equipment on board for specialized emergency responses.

Medic rescue engine/rescue engine
In the Ventura County Fire Department, a rescue engine is a 2 piece company that is assigned a standard engine and rescue truck. These units always respond together as a single company. The rescue truck carries all of the same equipment that a truck company carries, such as vehicle extrication tools, forcible entry tools and ventilation tools giving the rescue engine truck company capabilities without the aerial device of a truck company.

Ventura County Fire Department has 3 rescue engines, 1 rescue is paired with a BLS engine making the company a Rescue Engine (27) and 2 of the rescues are paired with Medic Engines to make them Medic Rescue Engines (23 & 31).

Each of the Rescue Engines / Medic Rescue Engines serve as the truck company / support company for their geographical region.

These companies are used instead of a large ladder truck with an aerial device because of the type of area they serve, either due to the terrain, making it difficult to operate a large truck company, or a lack of multi-story buildings making an aerial device unnecessary.

Water tenders
Ventura county fire department has 2 water tenders currently in service, they are water tender 40 and water tender 27. These units are used on brush fires when there is no hydrants available for engines to refill there pumps. They are stationed at station 40 and 27. 27 is much newer than 40, with 40 being an old KME, and the most notable feature of 40 is that instead of being yellow, like most of the other units in the department, it is red.

Quints
Ventura county fire department currently has one quint frontline and the one in reserve. What sets these units apart from other truck companies is that they have a pump and carry water. These quints are quints 44 and 144, and are stationed at station 44 in wood ranch. Quint 44 is the one in frontline and is a 2015 rosenbauer commander tractor drawn Quiller (quint+tiller), and the reserve one being quint 144, an American Lafrance rear mount quint, another fun fact is that code3customs made a diecast model of quint 144 when it was rescue engine 40. 144 also served as rescue engine 40, then got the paramedic designation and then was quint 44, and is now in reserve as quint 144. These units respond to calls as if they were and engine and a truck.

In addition to the main engines, Ventura County also has reserve engines which are older engines kept as backups or for use on major incidents. Two of the department reserve engines are provided by the Office of Emergency Services.

Wildland fire engines
Ventura County has 11 Type 3 wildland fire engines that are specifically designed for fighting wildland fires. One feature that sets these engines apart from the standard engines is their ability to pump water from a 500-gallon tank while on the move. This allows firefighters to make a running attack on the fire. This feature is called "pump and roll"

Helicopters

Ventura County has four Helicopters that are jointly used by the VCFD and the Ventura County Sheriff's Department. The fleet of helicopters is made up of four different Bell UH-1 Hueys, one each of the HH-1H, UH-1H, Bell 205B and Bell 212. Each Huey can carry up to nine firefighters, can fly up to 100 miles per hour, and features a 375-gallon water tank that can be used to make drops onto fires. In September 2019 Ventura County incorporated three UH-60 helicopters for firefighting use. The surplus helicopters, obtained from the U.S. Army,  are referred to as Firehawks and have been modified for crew transport, patient transport, and to carry water-dropping belly tanks. They provide increased speed (160 miles per hour) and water carrying capacity (1,000 gallons) over the existing fleet. In addition to fire fighting missions, the Hueys and Firehawks are used for search and rescue, emergency medical services, marijuana eradication and surveillance.

Aircraft Rescue and Firefighting Units (ARFF)
The Aircraft Rescue and Firefighting units are designed to fight large flammable liquid fires, specifically aircraft fires. They are also utilized on gasoline fires in refineries or tanker trucks on the highway. The engines carry 1,500 gallons of water and is fitted with a pump capable of 1,250 GPM. Two hundred gallons of foam concentrate is also carried on board.

Dozers
To aid in fighting wildfires, VCFD has multiple bulldozers. The dozers, as they are known, travel as a three piece unit consisting of the dozer itself, a tractor-trailer that transports the dozer which callsigns are "transoprt and a tender that carries tools for servicing the dozer in the field.

Fire boat
The VCFD has a 38-foot fireboat stationed at the Channel Islands Harbor. It is outfitted with a 1,000 GPM water cannon.

Emergency operations
Bolded stations serve as quarters for the various Battalion chiefs in the VCFD. There are 5 Battalions in the department, each commanded by a Battalion Chief. Station 54 is also the headquarters for the departments special operations.

Battalion 1
Headquartered at Station 54, Battalion 1 services the Camarillo and Somis areas as well as the department's Special Operations activities.  Special operations include dealing with hazardous materials, urban search and rescue, water rescue and specialized fire fighting activities such as shipboard and aircraft emergencies.

Battalion 2
Headquartered at Station 23, Battalion 2 services the Ojai Valley area as well as Santa Paula, Meiners Oaks, Oak View and Ventura

Battalion 3
Headquartered at Station 30, Battalion 3 services the area of Conejo Valley. Thousand Oaks, Newbury Park and Oak Park are also covered.

Battalion 4
Headquartered at Station 41, Battalion 4 services the areas of Simi Valley and Moorpark .

Battalion 5 
Headquartered at Station 51, Battalion 5 services the areas of Santa Paula, Fillmore, Oxnard, Piru, Port Hueneme and Malibu.

Organization
VCFD is under the auspices of the Ventura County Board of Supervisors, who appoint the Fire Chief.  Reporting directly to the Fire Chief, the Deputy Fire Chief oversees the five bureaus within the department:
Emergency Services Bureau
Support Services Bureau
Administrative Services Bureau
Fire Prevention Bureau
Business Services Bureau

Bureau of Emergency Services
This bureau provides fire suppression, emergency medical care, hazardous materials response, Urban search and rescue, swift water rescue, and the Fire Training Section.  Under the command of an assistant chief, the bureau composes all fire stations within the department, as well as the Fire Training and Emergency Medical Services Sections.

References

External links

VCFD Facebook page
VCFD Instagram

VCFD Vimeo page
VCFD Youtube page

Fire departments in California
Government of Ventura County, California
Organizations based in Ventura County, California
County government agencies in California